Gerbera ambigua is a species of flowering plant in the section Lasiopus of genus Gerbera belonging to the basal Mutisieae tribe within the large Asteraceae (or Compositae) family.

It is indigenous to Southern Africa and commonly known as the Botterblom or Griekwateebossie in Afrikaans. It was first described by Carl Heinrich 'Bipontinus' Schultz in Flora Journal in 1844.

Etymology
The genus was named in honour of German botanist and medical doctor Traugott Gerber (1710 — 1743). The Latin epithet ambigua means "doubtful".

Description

Gerbera ambigua is an acaulescent tufted perennial herb with thickened woody rootstock and naked flowering scapes up to 35 cm high. Leaves are very variable, usually petiolate, elliptical or oblanceolate, 5–8 cm long and 2.5–3.5 cm wide, thinly hairy above and white- or yellow-felted beneath. Flower-heads (capitula) are 2–5 cm in diameter, ray florets are white to yellow abobe and pink to coppery reddish on reverse. It flowers from September to February.

Distribution 
Gerbera ambigua grows in grassland and savanna of eastern South Africa, Lesotho, Eswatini and in tropical Southern Africa: Zaire, Angola, Zambia, Malawi, Tanzania, Zimbabwe, Mozambique, Malawi.

Habitat
The species grows from 1500 m to 2600 m above sea level on rocky slopes in woodland. It is able to survive both dry, cold winters and annual fires which are typical of the region in which it is found.

Ecology
The species is pollinated by many different flying insects including beetles which feed on the pollen.

References

External links
Gerbera.org — Official website of the Gerbera Association, established in Barberton.
Sanbi.org — Website about plants of Southern Africa, established by SA National Biodiversity Institute.

Mutisieae
Flora of South Africa
Plants described in 1844
Taxa named by Carl Heinrich 'Bipontinus' Schultz